Wish Upon a Blackstar is the second vocal studio album (third overall) from American electronic rock project, Celldweller. While the album had been a work in progress since 2004, finalized songs from the album were not released until mid-2009. The full album was released on June 12, 2012. Grant Mohrman, producer of the debut Celldweller album, returned to co-produce the album with Klayton.

Production
Klayton began to work on the album in 2004, originally slated for release in the summer of 2006, the album was delayed numerous times. In a late 2008 interview, he stated that:

"I would love to just tell everyone 'The album will be done by this date,' but I've learned my lesson on that one. It's hard to predict when it will actually wrap up. I can tell you that I am thinking about alternative methods of releasing this album altogether, but I won't say anything until I'm ready to commit... that always gets me in trouble."

On March 9, 2009, Klayton announced that the album would be titled Wish Upon a Blackstar and he revealed the track listing on April 20, 2009.

In contrast to the debut Celldweller album, where Klayton always tracked the vocals last, Wish Upon a Blackstar was produced vice versa: "[...] the process for this album is totally different than any other I've done. So, that being said, I've recorded all the final vocals first. That has usually been the last step for me, but I wanted to put more of an emphasis on vocals on this album, so [co-producer] Grant Mohrman and I agreed that I would cut vocals first and build everything else around them."

Klayton later announced that he chose to break up the album into five Chapters, instead of releasing a standard CD album after all production has wrapped:

"I fully embrace the idea of releasing one song at a time. Waiting years for a full album is cool and all, but times have changed. I can wrap a track in my studio and have it blaring out of your speakers literally the next day if so desired. I had some specific reasons I was planning on releasing [Wish Upon a Blackstar] as a full body of work, but I abandoned that a long time ago when I embraced just how much work I've created for myself with this album. I just don't totally feel right about releasing one song at a time for this album, but I have no intentions of waiting 'til I'm done with the whole thing either. So, I'm releasing the album in Chapters. [...] The fifth and final Chapter will be reserved for the CD, so both the artwork and the [...] remaining songs will be released for the first time on the physical CD".

The first four Chapters were released as digital downloads only and they were available in two editions:

 Standard Edition (includes the songs and a PDF booklet with lyrics, art and user submitted art)
 Deluxe Edition (includes songs and their instrumental versions, PDF booklet and Beta Cessions demo clips of each song through various stages of production)

Originally, there were to be 10 songs on the album, but Klayton added 7 more songs to the final CD, namely "Birthright", "The Seven Sisters", "Memories of a Girl I Haven't Met", "It Makes No Difference Who We Are", "The Arrival" and "The Departure" (Deluxe Edition only).

Artwork

Graphic artist Sam Hayles, who had previously designed the artwork of Soundtrack for the Voices in My Head Vol. 01, was hired again to create "original pieces of art that will be released with each Chapter. Then the art from Chapter 5 will tie together the other 4 images to create a grander single image." The cover art of the Standard Edition was designed by Devin Taylor. Also, Klayton asked Celldweller fans to suggest ASCII based emoticons to represent each song on the CD artwork.

The concept is very similar to the artwork of the album Deceptive Bends by the English band 10cc.

Themes
According to Klayton, Wish Upon a Blackstar is a concept album: "It wasn't originally intended to be but over time it became one. There are very specific running themes throughout. The basic moral is 'be careful what you wish for.'"

Music videos
Klayton stated that he has decided to produce a music video for "The Lucky One" and he has also considered letting his fans film his next live show for the video. Music videos for "I Can't Wait"
and "Unshakeable"
were also completed, with the "Unshakable" one being released on December 6, 2013.

Remixed Upon a Blackstar
In an interview, Klayton stated that he will be recruiting remixers to remix tracks from Wish Upon a Blackstar to make a separate remix album titled Remixed Upon a Blackstar. So far, Klayton has confirmed that BT will be remixing the song "Louder Than Words", as well as "Unshakeable" with SeamlessR, Toksin will be remixing "So Long Sentiment" and J. Scott G. and Joman will be remixing "The Best It's Gonna Get" with Imprintz & Kloe. As of mid-2012, only Toksin's remix of "So Long Sentiment" was released, first on the deluxe edition of Chapter 02 of Wish Upon a Blackstar, then on The Complete Cellout Vol. 01.

Blackstar novel

Release

Chapter 01

On April 20, 2009, Klayton revealed the track listing for Wish Upon a Blackstar on his official website.
On June 4, 2009, Klayton released the official lyrics to Chapter 01 ("Louder Than Words" & "So Long Sentiment") of Wish Upon a Blackstar along with a fifty-second preview of "So Long Sentiment".
On July 13, Klayton posted a video from his iPhone showing the synth bridge from an unreleased demo of "Louder Than Words". The synth shown did not make it to the final cut of the song.
On August 4, Klayton officially announced that Chapter 01 of Wish Upon a Blackstar would go live on August 25, 2009.
Klayton also announced that he would show a preview of "Louder Than Words" and the official cover for Wish Upon a Blackstar on August 10. Pre-orders of Chapter 01 began on August 20, 2009. 
Chapter 01 featuring "Louder Than Words" and "So Long Sentiment" was released on August 25, 2009.

Chapter 02

On November 10, Klayton announced that Chapter 02 would be released on December 8, 2009. On November 25, Klayton posted the cover art of Chapter 02 on his blog. The deadline for Chapter 02 fan art work was on December 4. Pre-orders of Chapter 02 began on December 1.
Chapter 02 featuring "Eon" and "The Best It's Gonna Get" was released on December 8, 2009.

Chapter 03

On May 24, 2010, Klayton released a sample take of "The Lucky One" on his website, allowing fans to submit their vocals as part of a contest to be featured on the album. The deadline for Chapter 03 fan artwork was on June 27. On June 28, 2010, Klayton announced the July 27 release date of Chapter 03 on his website. On July 16, Klayton posted the cover art of Chapter 03 on his blog and pre-orders of Chapter 03 began on the same day. On July 21, Klayton posted the preview of "Tainted" on FiXT Store. 
On July 25, the preview of "The Lucky One" was posted on FiXT Store.
On July 26, Chapter 03, featuring "The Lucky One" and "Tainted", was released 2 hours early.

Chapter 04

On May 11, 2011, Klayton announced that Chapter 04 would be released on June 28, 2011. The art submission deadline was June 15, 2011. On May 31, a preview of the song "I Can't Wait" was posted via Celldweller's Facebook. On June 7 the preview of "Gift for You" was posted on Celldweller's Facebook. Pre-orders of Chapter 04 began on June 14. On June 27, Klayton showed the full length versions of the songs on his Ustream profile at 8PM EST. After the broadcast, Chapter 04 featuring "I Can't Wait" and "Gift for You" was released on FiXT Store, about 3 hours earlier than the originally announced release date.

Chapter 05
Klayton tweeted early 2011 that "2011 is the year of the Blackstar" hinting that the rest of the album will be released by the end of the year. On July 17, Klayton posted the lyrics of "Memories of a Girl I Haven't Met" on his Facebook after reaching 85,000 likes on his profile. On September 8, Klayton posted the lyrics of the intro song on his Facebook and said that he wants the fans to entitle the song. The intro song was later announced to be titled as "It Makes No Difference Who We Are".

On November 24, 2011, Klayton announced that he is going to release the full album on March 27, 2012. However, on February 14, 2012, the album was delayed to May 22, 2012, due to a new deal with a distribution company which "needs the extra time to prepare the CD for release in stores". The album will not only be available at FiXT Store, but at every major digital retailer and in North American retail stores as well. Wish Upon a Blackstar with  16 full tracks, will be available as a digital download, a standard CD, and a 1000-count Limited Edition CD run.

Pre-orders of Wish Upon a Blackstar were scheduled to go live on March 27, 2012, the same time when the Live Upon a Blackstar Blu-ray DVD was set to be released. However, the Live Upon a Blackstar Blu-ray DVD was delayed first to April 17, 2012, then to May 22, 2012.

The release date of Wish Upon a Blackstar was moved again, to "a final release date in early June, 2012." This release date will not be changed, because it is "finally locked into place and not changing again".

On April 2, 2012, Klayton posted a 20-second preview of "Blackstar", celebrating the completion of the album.

On April 18, 2012, the final release date of Wish Upon a Blackstar was announced. The full album will be released on June 12, 2012 and the pre-orders would go live on May 4, 2012. The final album art and track list/sequence would be revealed when the pre-orders go live. There will also be a 2-CD Limited Edition version of Wish Upon a Blackstar, which features "the main album plus the instrumental version of the album". The radio edit version of "Unshakeable" was also announced which was released for free download on May 15, 2012.

On April 30, 2012, Klayton announced that Wish Upon a Blackstar will be available as a "Deluxe Limited Edition" as well. It will feature a continuous mix and a "different sequence from main album release, with custom transitions & all."

On May 3, 2012, pre-orders were delayed once again. It was stated that the "pre-orders will be launching 'soon'" and Klayton would show the final cover art of Wish Upon a Blackstar on the following day. On May 4, 2012, Klayton posted the cover arts of the album. There are two different cover arts, one for the Standard Edition and one for the Deluxe Edition, the latter cover art completes the full five panel image. The Deluxe Edition will be FiXT Store exclusive while the Standard Edition will be widely distributed in stores.

On May 8, 2012, Klayton stated that the pre-orders of Wish Upon a Blackstar are set to go live on May 15, 2012. On May 15, 2012, pre-orders went live along with audio previews of the whole album and the radio edit version of "Unshakeable" which was posted for free download on Alternative Press. On May 22, 2012, "Eon" was posted for free download on Revolvermag and on May 31, 2012, the radio edit version of "I Can't Wait" was posted for free download on Noisecreep.

On June 12, 2012, Wish Upon a Blackstar was released. The album debuted at No. 7 on the iTunes US Electronic Album Chart and on June 19, 2012, it reached No. 2 on the same chart.

Reception

The album was met with mostly positive reviews from music critics. Miranda Yardley from Terrorizer stated that: "You cannot begin to accuse Celldweller of being a one-trick pony and on the other hand, each track is distinctly their work. Klayton is a true musical mastermind of the 21st Century." Gregory Burkart from Fearnet praised the album, stating that "Wish Upon a Blackstar is an impressive example of Celldweller's evolutionary skills – adopting, adapting and rising above the genres that play a part in it." Pär Winberg from Melodic.net praised the album as well: "new album is amazing and real damn good. It is more synth and electronica than the previous work, yet also more progressive. And raw. And melodic. And, incredibly well produced and well performed".  In a less positive review, Fred Thomas from Allmusic said that "While the heavy production sounds by turns crisp or brutalizing, even the most exciting moments can't save the album from its cheesy lyrics and played-out musical choices, which are as abundant as its moments of legitimate excitement."

Track listing
The emoticons representing each song can be viewed here.

Note: In addition to the track listing being different between both editions, the deluxe edition (disc one) is a continuous mix with no pause between tracks.

Outtakes from the Wish Upon a Blackstar sessions
Between forty and fifty songs were demoed in the writing sessions for Wish Upon a Blackstar. Klayton explains:
"I approached the new Celldweller disc differently than any other album I've written. I just focused on writing songs I liked, and not so much on the ear candy and production as much – that would come later. So I ended up with almost twice as many songs that didn't make the new CD than ones that actually did make it."
Klayton has stated that many of these songs that did not end up on the album proper will make up the bulk of a second official Beta Cessions collection:

"In fact The Beta Cessions II (when I ever get around to working on those tracks) will be primarily new material and not a bunch of remixes and alternative versions of songs from the sophomore Celldweller album".

Based on the song titles mentioned in interviews and news postings, the following songs are known to be outtakes from Wish Upon a Blackstar:

"Uncrowned" was written in 2000 and is actually an outtake from the debut Celldweller album that Klayton has claimed would appear on or with the second album. It was finally released with the re-issue of the debut Celldweller album on June 10, 2013. Two singles released in anticipation of Wish Upon a Blackstar, "Shapeshifter" and "Tragedy", did not appear on the album and also ended up on the Celldweller re-issue.

Groupees promotions
On May 4, 2011, Atmospheric Light was released on the Groupees Unreleased EP in a 72-hour exclusive sale on Groupees after reaching the goal of $6,000 and on October 26, 2011, Klayton released it as a free download for reaching 100,000 likes on his Facebook profile.

On October 26, 2011, it was announced that a demo of "IRIA" would be released if the Groupees Halloween Trick or Treat charity event earned over $5000. If it earned more than $10,000, then an acoustic version of "It Makes No Difference Who We Are" would also be released. In the end it reached the $5000 goal and "IRIA" was released on November 1, 2011.

On October 26, 2012, another Groupees campaign was launched. On November 14, 2012, at the end of the campaign, donors unlocked a new 3-song EP, Groupees Charity Fundraiser, with demo songs that were intended for Wish Upon a Blackstar. These songs were "Waiting (2005 Demo)", "Blood From the Stone (2005 Demo)" and "06-06-06 (2006 Demo)".

Beta Cessions (Demos Vol 01.)
On December 23, 2011, the Beta Cessions (Demos Vol 01.) EP was released featuring "IRIA (2005 Demo)" and both the vocal and instrumental versions of "Atmospheric Light (2004 Demo)"

The demo songs released during the Groupees promotions will be re-released on the second disc of the 2-CD Deluxe Edition of the Celldweller Debut Album 10th Anniversary Re-Issue.

Demo Vault

In February 2014, Klayton started a YouTube series, "Demo Vault", through which he could release Celldweller-related demos, it is through this series that "The Way She Wants to Die" was released, as well as two more previously unknown outtakes, "Spacestation" and "Buzzsaw".

All three were formally released on May 30, 2014, as part of Demo Vault Vol. 01.

Personnel

Celldweller
 Klayton - vocals, synthesizers, guitar, bass, percussion, songwriting, production, mixing, editing, mastering, programming

Additional personnel
 Bret Autrey (Blue Stahli) - eastern melodies on "So Long Sentiment", additional vocals on "It Makes No Difference Who We Are" and "The Lucky One"
 John London Whitney - drums on "I Can't Wait", "Blackstar", "Birthright", "The Seven Sisters" and "Against the Tide"
 Tom Salta - orchestration and choir recording on "Birthright"
 John Pregler - additional chorus guitar on "So Long Sentiment"
 Jason Waggoner - additional acoustic guitar in "The Best It's Gonna Get"
 Cellmate Worldwide Mass Choir - additional vocals on "The Lucky One"
 The Celldweller Detroit Mass Choir - additional vocals on "It Makes No Difference Who We Are"
 Christina Wheeler (XINA) - female vocals on "So Long Sentiment"
 Jenny Jackknife - female vocals on "Gift for You"
 Ryan Boelster - additional vocals on "It Makes No Difference Who We Are" and "The Lucky One"
 Josh Danforth - additional vocals on "It Makes No Difference Who We Are"
 Terry Desperance - provided drum kit
 Ken Capton - provided drum kit
 Will Callender - bass guitar

Additional production
 Grant Mohrman - production, mixing, photography
 Tom Baker - mastering
 Brian Gardner - mastering
 Bret Autrey (Blue Stahli) - additional editing on "Louder Than Words", "Eon" and "The Lucky One"
 Steve Dresser - additional editing on "So Long Sentiment"
 Josh Danforth - additional editing on "I Can't Wait"
 Ryan Boelster - additional editing on "I Can't Wait" and "Blackstar"
 Derek Steele - additional editing on "The Best It's Gonna Get", "The Lucky One" and "Tainted"

Artwork and packaging
 Sam Hayles (Dose Productions) - artwork (Chapters 01-04, Deluxe Edition) and merchandise design
 Devin Taylor - artwork design (Standard Edition)
 Chuck Wheeler - original photo for the Standard Edition artwork
 Paul Udarov - modelled the 3D planet for the Standard Edition artwork
 Miranda - "Elara" model
 Karen I Trims & Togs - "Elara" wardrobe
 Natalie Jenkins - Eyewear
 Christina Travis and Jillian Johns - Hair/Makeup

Licensing
 "Eon" was used in the 2010 video game, Dead Rising 2.
 "The Best It's Gonna Get" was used as the intro music of the 2012 Bojangles' Southern 500 NASCAR race. The "J Scott G & Joman Remix" of the song (from The Complete Cellout) was used in the How I Met Your Mother episode, Twelve Horny Women.
 "I Can't Wait" was used in the 2012 video game, KickBeat.
 "It Makes No Difference Who We Are" was used in the promo of The Vampire Diaries episode, "We'll Always Have Bourbon Street".

References

External links
 Celldweller's Blackstar is Rising! - FEARNet

Celldweller albums
2012 albums
Science fiction concept albums